LinuxWorld has various meanings:

 LinuxWorld Conference and Expo - a series of Linux conferences worldwide that became OpenSource World in 2009
 LinuxWorld Magazine - a print publication produced from 2003 to 2006
 LinuxWorld.com - a web publication produced by Network World, an International Data Group company